The 2006 10,000 Lakes Festival was held July 19 through July 22.  In 2006, over 18,000 people attended.

2006 Lineup

Phil Lesh & Friends                       
Trey Anastasio                            
The String Cheese Incident                    
Benevento/Russo Duo featuring Mike Gordon 
The Keller Williams Incident              
O.A.R.                                    
Umphrey's McGee                           
Big Head Todd & The Monsters              
Keller Williams                           
Medeski Martin & Wood                     
Steve Kimock & Steve Perkins                          
Railroad Earth                            
The Everyone Orchestra                    
Shooter Jennings                          
Garaj Mahal                               
The Big Wu                                
Great American Taxi featuring Vince Herman
The Mutaytor
Hot Buttered Rum                          
Assembly of Dust                          
Tea Leaf Green                            
The Wood Brothers                         
RAQ                                       
Papa Mali                                 
Jacob Fred Jazz Odyssey                   
The Breakfast                             
Green Lemon                               
Trampled by Turtles                       
Fat Maw Rooney                            
Backyard Tire Fire                        
God Johnson                               
Freshwater Collins                        
Tim Sparks                                
White Iron Band                           
Hooch                                     
Down Lo
New Primitives
Unity
Moses Mayes                               
GypsyFoot                                 
Stellar Road                              
U-Melt                                    
Family Groove Company                     
Madahoochi                                
Cornmeal
Stealin' Strings                          
Gold Standard         
Jazzwholes                                
Public Property                           
Hyentyte                                  
Cool Waters Band                          
WBPN                       
Soap                      
Kinetix                 
Hobo Nephews

References

10,000 Lakes Festival
2006 in American music
2006 music festivals
10000